The Fresh Breeze Flyke is a German powered parachute tricycle designed and produced by Fresh Breeze of Wedemark. The aircraft is supplied complete and ready-to-fly.

Design and development
The Flyke is a powered parachute that is also a roadable tricycle that can be pedaled to an airport to launch it or ridden cross country. The manufacturer says, "There are obvious advantages: You can enjoy the comfort and simplicity of this Aircraft and also use it on the road to get to your airfield or plan trips. This trike is famous for crossing whole countries while flying and cycling over borders. You take your tent with you and camp right there where you land and go on the next day. Landing out on a field and cycle to the next gas station. With this trike there are no boundaries."

The Flyke was designed to comply with the Fédération Aéronautique Internationale microlight category and the US FAR 103 Ultralight Vehicles rules. It features a parachute-style wing, single-place accommodation, tricycle landing gear and a single  Hirth F33 engine in pusher configuration.

The aircraft carriage is built from powder coated aluminium with some steel parts. In flight steering is accomplished via handles that actuate the canopy brakes, creating roll and yaw. On the ground the aircraft has under-seat, handle-controlled nosewheel steering. The main landing gear incorporates spring rod suspension. Road gearing is standard equipment, with mountain gearing optional. An optional telescoping rear axle allows a narrow wheel track for road use and a wider one for take-off and landing to increase stability and reduce the risk of roll-overs. Optional equipment includes wheel fenders, head and tail light mounts and a ballistic parachute. There is space to stow the canopy behind the seat for road transport.

Specifications (Flyke)

References

External links

Flyke
2000s German sport aircraft
2000s German ultralight aircraft
Single-engined pusher aircraft
Powered parachutes